HE 2359-2844 is a subdwarf located approximately 800 light years away in the constellation Sculptor, with a surface temperature of approximately . Along with stars HE 1256-2738 and LS IV-14 116, HE 2359-2844 forms a new group of star called heavy metal subdwarfs.

HE 2359-2844 contains very high levels of lead - 10,000 times more than the Sun. It also contains 10,000 times more yttrium and zirconium than the Sun. Dr. Naslim Neelamkodan explained that "the heavy-metal stars are a crucial link between bright red giants, stars thirty or forty times the size of the Sun, and faint blue subdwarfs, stars one fifth the size, but seven times hotter and seventy times brighter than the Sun."

References

B-type subdwarfs
Sculptor (constellation)
Chemically peculiar stars